Anthony Robert Aikman (3 February 19428 July 2011) was a British screenwriter and film director.

Personal life 
Aikman grew up in St Margarets Bay.  He was educated at Mercers and Westminster. He graduated from the University of Wales in 1962.  He spent much of his life travelling and living in south-east Asia, partly in treehouses and working as a bush-doctor.

Books 
 The caves of Segada, Hale, 1985, 
 Eye of Itza, Robert Hale Ltd, (October 23, 1986), 
 The Brokers of Doom, Hale, 1987, 
The foregoing 3 books form a trilogy.
 Treehouses, Robert Hale, 1988, 
 The farang, Oldham Books, 1992, 
 The black swan, Post Books, 1999, 
 Boy, doc, and the green man: also the fire-eater : a short story, Post Books, 2000, 
 and many more articles and short stories

Filmwork

Screenplay-Director 
The Genesis Children. 1971

References

External links
Author's website

English film directors
English male writers
1942 births
2011 deaths